Bulduk may refer to:

Bulduk, Pazaryeri, a village in the District of Pazaryeri, Bilecik Province, Turkey
Bulduk, Şabanözü
Buldug, a village and municipality in the Sabirabad Rayon of Azerbaijan

See also 
Bulduklu (disambiguation)